Sexy Pee Story is the sixth studio album by Minneapolis-based noise rock band Cows. It was released on March 23, 1993, by Amphetamine Reptile Records.

Release and reception
A music video was made for "Sugar Torch" and directed by David Roth. It can be found on the Dope, Guns & Fucking up Your Videodeck, Vol. 1-3 DVD released by Mvd Visual.

AllMusic staff writer John Dougan gave the album four and a half out of five stars, calling it a "terrific, noisy, clamorous record stuffed to the gills with pure punk rock excitement."

Spin wrote: "Comfy with its funk now, the rhythm unit bangs down walls, as intelligent guitar noise blankets the mess, segueing smoothly between melody and tuneless abrasion."

Track listing

Personnel
Adapted from the Sexy Pee Story liner notes.

Cows
 Thor Eisentrager – guitar
 Norm Rogers – drums
 Kevin Rutmanis – bass guitar
 Shannon Selberg – vocals, bugle

Production and additional personnel
 Iain Burgess – production, engineering
 Cows – production
 Tom Hazelmyer – design

Release history

References

External links 
 

1993 albums
Albums produced by Iain Burgess
Amphetamine Reptile Records albums
Cows (band) albums